The 1959 Connecticut Huskies baseball team represented the University of Connecticut in the 1959 NCAA University Division baseball season. The Huskies were led by J. O. Christian in his 24th year as head coach, and played as part of the Yankee Conference. Connecticut posted a 20–3 record, earned the Yankee Conference championship with a 10–0 regular season to claim the automatic bid to the 1959 NCAA University Division baseball tournament. They were an automatic selection to the 1959 College World Series for District 1, their second appearance in the ultimate college baseball event. The Huskies lost their first game against Penn State and were eliminated by Western Michigan.

Roster

Schedule

References 

Connecticut
UConn Huskies baseball seasons
1959 in Connecticut
Yankee Conference baseball champion seasons
College World Series seasons